Parakrama Samudra (or King Parakrama's sea or the Sea of King Parakrama) is a shallow reservoir (wewa), consisting of five separate wewa (reservoirs) (thopa, dumbutulu, erabadu, bhu, kalahagala tanks) connected by narrow channels in Polonnaruwa, Sri Lanka.

The northernmost reservoir is the oldest and referred to as Topa wewa (Sinhalese wewa is almost equal to English word lake or reservoir, but used unique Sri Lankan technology) built around 386 AD.
The middle section Eramudu wewa and the southernmost portion, at the highest elevation, is Dumbutula wewa, both sections were added and the reservoir expanded during the reign of King Parâkramabâhu I. This wewa (reservoir) was built under the quote "do not let even a drop of rainwater in this country to go to the sea without use". The wewa (reservoir) was so large it was called Samudhraya which means "the ocean".

References

External links 

Bodies of water of Polonnaruwa District
Buildings and structures in North Central Province, Sri Lanka
Reservoirs in Sri Lanka
Lakes of Sri Lanka